Gita Sen is an Indian feminist scholar. She is a Distinguished Professor & Director at the Ramalingaswami Centre on Equity & Social Determinants of Health, at the Public Health Foundation of India. She is also an adjunct professor at Harvard University, a professor emeritus at the Indian Institute of Management Bangalore, and the General Coordinator of DAWN (Development Alternatives with Women for a New Era).

Education 
Sen received her M.A. in Economics from Delhi School of Economics and her Ph.D. in Economics from Stanford University. She holds honorary doctorates from the University of East Anglia, the Karolinska Institute, the Open University, and the University of Sussex.

Career 
Sen was the first chairperson of the World Bank's External Gender Consultative Group and was a member on the Millennium Project's Task-force on Gender Equality.

Sen has worked with the United Nations in several capacities, including as the lead consultant for the United Nations Population Fund's 2003–2007 India Population Assessment. She also serves on the Scientific and Technical Advisory group for the World Health Organization's Department of Reproductive Health and Research.

Currently, Sen is an adjunct professor of Global Health and Population at the Harvard T.H. Chan School of Public Health and a professor emeritus at the Indian Institute of Management Bangalore. In 2020 she was honored with the Dan David Prize.

Selected bibliography

Books
 Gender Equity in Health: the Shifting Frontiers of Evidence and Action (Routledge, 2010).
 Women's Empowerment and Demographic Processes – Moving Beyond Cairo (Oxford University Press/IUSSP, 2000).
 Population Policies Reconsidered: Health, Empowerment and Rights (Harvard University Press, 1994).

Journal articles

See also
 Population study
 Peggy Antrobus
 Lourdes Benería
 Feminism in India

Sources

Living people
American feminists
Indian emigrants to the United States
Stanford University alumni
Delhi School of Economics alumni
Indian feminists
Multicultural feminism
Postmodern feminists
American women writers of Indian descent
1948 births